The 1979–80 NCAA Division I men's basketball season began on November 17, 1979, progressed through the regular season and conference tournaments, and concluded with the 1980 NCAA Division I men's basketball tournament championship game on March 24, 1980, at the Market Square Arena in Indianapolis. The Louisville Cardinals won their first NCAA national championship with a 59–54 victory over the UCLA Bruins.

Rule changes 
 Officials were ordered to more strictly enforce foul rules already on the books, including bench decorum, hand-checking and charging fouls.
 Any mistaken attempt to call a time-out after a team runs out of time-outs results in a technical foul and two free throws for the opposing team. The rule would figure prominently in the outcome of the 1993 NCAA Division I men's basketball tournament.

Season headlines 

 ESPN launched in November as the first all-sports television network. It took advantage of college basketball's rapidly growing popularity to begin a highly profitable relationship with the NCAA which greatly expanded television coverage of college basketball in the United States. 
 The basketball-centered original Big East Conference began play. Working closely with ESPN, it rapidly developed a reputation as a powerhouse of college basketball and a dominating force in the sport.
 The NCAA tournament expanded from 40 to 48 teams.
 ESPN televised 23 games of the 1980 NCAA tournament, becoming the first television network to broadcast the early rounds of an NCAA Tournament.
 Louisville's "doctors of dunk" brought Denny Crum his first NCAA title with a 59–54 win over surprise finalist UCLA and coach Larry Brown. Wooden Award winner Darrell Griffith was named Final Four Most Outstanding Player.
 The first year of the Ralph Sampson era ended with a Virginia Cavaliers National Invitation Tournament championship – a 58–55 win over Minnesota. Sampson, a  freshman center, was named the tournament's Most Valuable Player.

Season outlook

Pre-season polls 

The top 20 from the AP Poll and UPI Coaches Poll during the pre-season.

Regular season

Conference winners and tournaments 

Note: From 1975 to 1982, the Eastern College Athletic Conference (ECAC), a loosely organized sports federation of Northeastern colleges and universities, organized Division I ECAC regional tournaments for those of its members that were independents in basketball. Each 1980 tournament winner received an automatic bid to the 1980 NCAA Division I men's basketball tournament in the same way that the tournament champions of conventional athletic conferences did. The ECAC North was a separate, conventional conference.

Informal championships

Statistical leaders

Post-Season tournaments

NCAA tournament

Final Four 
Played at Market Square Arena in Indianapolis, Indiana

 Third Place – Purdue 75, Iowa 58

National Invitation tournament

NIT semifinals and final 
Played at Madison Square Garden in New York City

 Third Place – Illinois 84, UNLV 74

Awards

Consensus All-American teams

Major player of the year awards 

 Wooden Award: Darrell Griffith, Louisville
 Naismith Award: Mark Aguirre, DePaul
 Helms Player of the Year: Darrell Griffith, Louisville
 Associated Press Player of the Year: Mark Aguirre, DePaul
 UPI Player of the Year: Mark Aguirre, DePaul
 NABC Player of the Year: Michael Brooks, La Salle
 Oscar Robertson Trophy (USBWA): Mark Aguirre, DePaul
 Adolph Rupp Trophy: Mark Aguirre, DePaul
 Sporting News Player of the Year: Darrell Griffith, Louisville

Major coach of the year awards 

 Associated Press Coach of the Year: Ray Meyer, DePaul
 Henry Iba Award (USBWA): Ray Meyer, DePaul
 NABC Coach of the Year: Lute Olson, Iowa
 UPI Coach of the Year: Ray Meyer, DePaul
 Sporting News Coach of the Year: Lute Olson, Iowa

Other major awards 

 Frances Pomeroy Naismith Award (Best player under 6'0): Jim Sweeney, Boston College
 Robert V. Geasey Trophy (Top player in Philadelphia Big 5): Michael Brooks, La Salle
 NIT/Haggerty Award (Top player in New York City metro area): Jeff Ruland, Iona

Coaching changes 
A number of teams changed coaches during the season and after the season ended.

References 

 
NCAA